2020–21 KCA President's Cup T20 was the inaugural season of KCA President's Cup T20 conducted by Kerala Cricket Association for promoting cricketers from Kerala. The tournament was held from March 6 to March 17.

It was planned to be held from 17th December 2020 to 3 January 2021. Later it was postponed as the Kerala government didn't give clearance to start the competition due to Covid-19 pandemic.

The competition started with a round robin group stage, in which each of the 6 teams played a match against every other team. This was followed by the playoffs. Each team had 14 players. All the matches were day-games with white ball and coloured clothing as per BCCI playing conditions. Two matches were played in a day. There were a total of 33 matches.

The Kerala senior team players who were in Delhi for the 2020-21 Vijay Hazare Trophy knockout matches joined their respective squads later after undergoing RT-PCR tests on return. Though Sanju Samson didn't play the tournament.

Venue for KCA President's Cup T20 was Sanatana Dharma College Ground, Alappuzha. The sponsors of the KCA President's Cup T20 was Dream 11.

Teams

Squads

KCA Royals

KCA Eagles
Players with International caps are listed in bold.

KCA Tuskers
Players with International caps are listed in bold.

KCA Tigers
Players with International caps are listed in bold.

KCA Lions
Players with International caps are listed in bold.

KCA Panthers
Players with International caps are listed in bold.

League stage
March 6

KCA Lions vs KCA Tigers, 9:00 AM

KCA Panthers vs KCA Royals, 1:30 PM

March 7

KCA Eagles vs KCA Tuskers,  9:00 AM

KCA Lions vs KCA Royals, 1:30 PM

March 8

KCA Eagles vs KCA Tigers, 9:00 AM

KCA Panthers vs KCA Tuskers, 1:30 PM

March 9

KCA Lions vs KCA Panthers, 9:00 AM

KCA Royals vs KCA Tigers, 1:30 PM

March 10

KCA Eagles vs KCA Lions, 9:00 AM

KCA Royals vs KCA Tuskers, 1:30 PM

March 11

KCA Eagles vs KCA Panthers, 9:00 AM

KCA Tigers vs KCA Tuskers, 1:30 PM

March 12

KCA Eagles vs KCA Royals, 9:00 AM

KCA Panthers vs KCA Tigers, 1:30 PM

March 13

KCA Lions vs KCA Tuskers, 9:00 AM

KCA Royals vs KCA Tigers, 1:30 PM

Match 14

KCA Eagles vs KCA Tuskers, 9:00 AM

KCA Lions vs KCA Panthers, 1:30 PM

March 16

KCA Lions vs KCA Tigers, 9:00 AM

KCA Royals vs KCA Tuskers, 1:30 PM

March 17

KCA Eagles vs KCA Lions, 9:00 AM

KCA Royals vs KCA Tuskers, 1:30 PM

March 18

KCA Eagles vs KCA Tigers, 9:00 AM

KCA Panthers vs KCA Tuskers, 1:30 PM

March 19

KCA Lions vs KCA Royals, 9:00 AM

KCA Panthers vs KCA Tigers at 1:30 PM

March 20

KCA Eagles vs KCA Royals, 9:00 AM

KCA Lions vs KCA Tuskers, 1:30 PM

March 21

KCA Eagles v KCA Panthers, 9:00 AM

KCA Tigers v KCA Tuskers, 1:30 PM

March 22

Semi-final 1: TBC vs TBC, 9:00 AM

Semi-final 2: TBC vs TBC, 1:30 PM

March 23

Final, 1:30 PM

References

External links
Official website

Twenty20 cricket leagues
Cricket in Kerala
Cricket leagues in India